Julie Owono (born 1986) is a French and Cameroonian lawyer. , she serves as executive director of Internet Sans Frontières (Internet Without Borders; IWB), and as a member of Facebook's independent Oversight Board.

Early life
Owono was born in Cameroon and grew up in Russia and France. Owono received a master's degree in International Law from La Sorbonne Law School. She has worked as a blogger for Global Voices and an opinion columnist for Al-Jazeera, commenting on the politics of the Gulf of Guinea.

Internet Sans Frontieres
By the mid-2010s, Owono was active in IWB, "a Paris-based non-profit organization advocating for freedom of expression on the internet", becoming head of its Africa desk. In that capacity, she lauded the growth of internet growth in African countries, but cautioned that their governments must avoid censoring the internet, stating that "[a] government cannot say that it wants to fully get into the digital economy and treat the essential commodity of that economy in the way we have seen so far".

In 2018 and 2019, Owono sought to pressure the government of Chad to restore internet access that had been cut off certain parts of the country. Owono indicated that the restriction occurred "because videos of violent clashes among the Zaghawa tribe in northern Chad were being shared on WhatsApp". Owono sought to persuade western military allies to pressure the government of Chad to restore access but was disappointed in the response. Owono also oversaw a fundraiser to buy premium VPN access for journalists and activists, which raised €2,000 ($2250).

In 2020, Owono was one of 20 individuals from around the world named to the Facebook Oversight Board, an organization established to make consequential precedential decisions about content moderation on the platforms of Facebook and Instagram. , Owono is the Executive Director at Internet Sans Frontieres.

References

External links
 

1980s births
Year of birth missing (living people)
Cameroonian people
University of Paris alumni
Facebook Oversight Board members
Living people